The 1916 New South Wales Rugby Football League premiership was the ninth season of Sydney’s top-level professional rugby league competition, Australia’s first. Eight teams from across the city contested during the season which culminated in a grand final between Balmain and South Sydney.

Season summary
Three teams dominated the season, Balmain, South Sydney and Glebe. With two rounds to go, each of the three teams had a genuine chance of winning the premiership with each separated by half a win. This created an interesting scenario with Balmain (20 points, first) facing South Sydney (18 points, third) and Glebe (19 points, second) facing Eastern Suburbs who were placed fourth at the time. As it turned out, Balmain lost 11–7 to Souths, leaving the competition wide open for Glebe to take the competition lead by one point. However, Glebe ended up losing crucially to Eastern Suburbs 8–5 on the same day. With both Balmain and Souths now equal on 20 points with one game to play, it would have taken a miracle for Glebe to come back given that they were still on 19 points. All three teams won their final games, but it was equal placed Balmain and South Sydney that would play off in a premiership decider.

Teams
The teams remained unchanged from the previous season.

 Annandale
 Balmain, formed on January 23, 1908, at Balmain Town Hall
 Eastern Suburbs, formed on January 24, 1908, at Paddington Town Hall
 Glebe, formed on January 9, 1908
 Newtown, formed on January 14, 1908
 North Sydney, formed on February 7, 1908
 South Sydney, formed on January 17, 1908, at Redfern Town Hall
 Western Suburbs, formed on February 4, 1908

Ladder

Final
Having won all three grades in 1915 Balmain returned in 1916 to repeat the effort for a second straight season. At the conclusion of the season Balmain and Souths were equal aloft the premiership ladder with 22 points apiece. The League did not expect such a finish and a Final had to be scheduled. This Final was held at the Sydney Cricket Ground where they were to be held for many years to come. The game played on July 26, 1916, in front of just six thousand people, saw the lead change three times in the first half with Balmain ahead 5–3 at the break after a try by Arthur Halloway and a penalty goal by Charles “Chook” Fraser. The second half saw the game played predominantly on Balmain's line, with South Sydney putting on repeated attacks. However, the Balmain defence never gave in and the score didn't change by game's end – a two-point margin securing Balmain's second consecutive title.

Balmain 5 (Try: Arthur Halloway. Goal: Charles Fraser)

defeated
 
South Sydney 3 (Try: Gordon Vaughan )

References

External links
 Rugby League Tables - Notes AFL Tables
 Rugby League Tables - Season 1916 AFL Tables
 Premiership History and Statistics RL1908
 1916 - Balmain Beats Souths In Final RL1908
Results: 1911-20 at rabbitohs.com.au

New South Wales Rugby League premiership
Nswrfl Season